Aci Bonaccorsi is a comune (municipality) in the Metropolitan City of Catania in the Italian region Sicily, located about  southeast of Palermo and about  northeast of Catania.
   
Aci Bonaccorsi borders the following municipalities: Aci Sant'Antonio, San Giovanni la Punta, Valverde, Viagrande.

References

External links
Official website  

Cities and towns in Sicily
Articles which contain graphical timelines